Gloria Evangelina Elizondo López-Llera (28 April 1929 – 2 October 2017) was a Mexican actress and singer from the Golden Age of Mexican cinema. She starred in movies, television and theater. She was an accomplished artist having studied at the National School of Painting and had a degree in theology. She wrote two books and recorded numerous albums. In 2014, she received a Premios Arlequín (Harlequin Prize) for her contributions to Mexican culture.

Biography
Gloria Evangelina Elizondo López-Llera was born on 28 April 1929 in Mexico City. Her mother, Evangelina López Llera, was a painter. At the age of 21, she won a contest to become the voice of Cinderella in the original Spanish-language release of the Walt Disney feature film.
Her first acting performance, at the Teatro Margo was as a dancer in the 1950 production of Los de abajo by Mariano Azuela. From that starting point, she went on to participate in many stage productions including Mame, Yo y mi Chica, Dónde está el Tenor, and  La viuda alegre.

Her first film was Las locuras de Tin-Tan with Germán Valdés made in 1951. After that, some of her favorite films were Frontera Norte (1953), Educando a Papá (1954), Pueblo de Proscritos (1955), and Los Platillos Voladores (1955).

From 1954-55, she filmed nine pictures in Cuba and when she returned she made Tropicana (1956), Superflaco (1957) and El Castillo de los Monstrous (1957). The last two were personal favorites, one because it was a musical and the other because it was an Abbott and Costello-type film and the actors in it were enjoyable to work with. In her later career, Elizondo filmed El Mistero de los Hongos Alucinantes (1967), Noche de Terror (1987), and the English-language film, A Walk in the Clouds (1994). She made over 75 films, mostly comedies and musicals, as she did not like dramatic works.

In 1959, she married an engineer, José Luis Paganoni. They separated in 1960. On 27 May 1960, Elizondo, who was participating in the play 30 minutos de amor at the Rotunda Theatre with Ramón Gay, had gone to dinner with Gay after their performance. The couple was accosted by Paganoni, and during the argument, Gay was shot. Elizondo called for an ambulance and Gay was taken to Rubén Leñero Hospital. He succumbed to his wounds on 28 May 1960.

Shortly after that event, she recorded her first musical album, La sensacional Evangelina, which was released in 1961 and she has recorded numerous LPs and CDs. Her music spans from children's songs, to opera, to inspirational songs. She was the first woman to lead an orchestra, which she did for over 12 years.

Elizondo also performed in several telenovelas for both Televisa and TV Azteca. La frontera, El pecado de Oyuki, El abuelo y yo, Tres veces Sofía, Besos prohibidos and Mirada de Mujer, el regreso. In the last two, she performed as the character "Mamá Lena", who has become a cultural icon in Mexico. "Mama Lena" is the personification of traditional values meeting the modern world and the emotions that accompany the clashes that inevitably occur. In addition to serials, Elizondo has filmed several commercials, including commercials for American television. In 1996, she did a commercial for the California Milk Commission.

She studied various art media: acrylic with Froylán Ojeda, murals with Ignacio Aguirre, oils with Jorge Quiroz, who also taught her how to paint hands, and attended the National School of Painting "La Esmeralda". She studied with the master painter, José Bardasano Baos and in 1973, she held her first solo exhibition of her artworks. Initially her style was surrealistic with bold use of color, but her later works are more realistic depictions of animals, landscapes and people. As of 2014, she had participated in 64 group art showings and 15 solo exhibitions.

She studied theology and graduated with a bachelor's degree in theology in 1993 from La Salle University. She has written a book about art, as well one about philosophy, entitled "Pensamiento Abierto," and published numerous articles.

In 2004, Elizondo began working full-time at the National Association of Actors (ANDA) as Secretary of Labor and Conflicts but was dismissed in 2012. She sued and won her case for wrongful termination in 2013.

Elizondo was the recipient of a 2014 Premios Arlequín (Harlequin Prize) for her contributions to Mexican culture.

Death and legacy 
Elizondo died on 2 October 2017 in Mexico City, aged 88. A Google Doodle on 28 April 2019 commemorated Elizondo’s 90th birth anniversary.

Published works

Books
 "Evangelina Elizondo: pintura" Instituto Nacional de Bellas Artes, Mexico City (1963) (in Spanish) (OCLC #176183788)
 "Pensamiento abierto: se puede ser feliz aun—en un mundo de hombres" Editorial Grad, Mexico City (1999) (in Spanish)

Albums
La sensacional Evangelina, Coro (1961) (in Spanish)
Evangelina Elizondo, Cisne (1963) (in Spanish)

Filmography

Film

 Las locuras de Tin-Tan (1952) - Paloma
 Swingtime in Mexico (1952, RKO Screenliner) - Band Singer
 Amor, qué malo eres (1953) - Lilia de la Cueva
 Genio y figura (1953) - Victoria
 Frontera norte (1953) - Rosaura
 La intrusa (1954, Cuba) - Tania
 Los tres Villalobos (1954, Cuba)
 Educando a papá (1955, Cuba)
 Amor de lejos (1955, Cuba) - Adela
 El tren expreso (1955, Cuba) - Novia de Mario
 Qué bravas son las costeñas (1955, Cuba) - Beatriz
 Música, espuelas y amor (1955, Cuba) - Evangelina
 Los tres Villalobos (1955) - Betty
 La venganza de los Villalobos (1955, Cuba) - Betty
 Fugitivos: Pueblo de proscritos (1955) - Chabela
 Mi canción eres tú (1956) - Chui
 Viva la juventud (1956) - Walipolera
 No me platiques más (1956)
 Los Platillos Voladores (also known as Llegaron los Marcianos) (1956, Cuba) - Saturnina
 Los platillos voladores (1956) - Saturnina
 Las zapatillas verdes (1956) - Rosalinda
 Rapto al sol (1956)
 Tropicana (1957)
 Te vi en tv (1958) - Rita
 Tú y la mentira (1958) - María Veléz
 Música en la noche (1958)
 Manos arriba (1958) - Gloria
 El castillo de los monstruos (1958) - Beatriz
 El superflaco (1959) - Rebeca; Brigida Loyo
 Ángel del infierno (1959)
 Verano violento (1960) - Sofía
 Una canción para recordar (1960)
 México lindo y querido (1961)
 Tres balas perdidas (1961) - Bárbara
 La furia del ring (1961)
 Los falsos héroes (1962)
 La chacota (1962)
 Días de otoño (1963) - Rita
 Un hombre en la trampa (1965) - Sra. Fuentes
 El amor no es pecado (1965) - Pilar, la chalupa
 Pistoleros del oeste (1965)
 Un callejón sin salida (1965) - Patricia
 El tragabalas (1966) - Luz
 Esta noche no (1966) - Berta
 Domingo salvaje (1967)
 Un novio para dos hermanas (1967) 
 Don Juan 67 (1967)
 El misterio de los hongos alucinantes (1968)
 El matrimonio es como el demonio (1969) - Señora Ancira
 El hombre de negro (1969) - Mary
 Gregorio and His Angel (1970)
 La generala (1971) - Raquel
 Te quiero (1979)
 Don't Panic (1988) - Reception Nurse
 ¿Nos traicionará el presidente? (1988) - Señora Rodriguez
 Romero (1989) - Josephina Gatedo
 A Walk in the Clouds (1995) - Guadelupe Aragon
 There Is No Pain in Paradise (1995) - Dona Carlota
 Alta tensión (1997)
 E pur si muove (2003, Short)
 Las Buenrostro (2005) - Brigida
 Me late chocolate (2013) - Abuela Moni
 Princesa, una historia verdadera (2018) - María (final film role)

Telenovelas
 Frontera (1967)
 El pecado de Oyuki (1988) - Diana 
 El abuelo y yo (1992) - Sofia 
 Mirada de mujer (1997–1998) - Doña Elena viuda de Domínguez "Mamálena"
 Tres veces Sofía (1998) - Magnolia 
 Besos prohibidos (1999) - Cristina 
 Cuando seas mia (2001–2002) - Doña Inés Ugarte Vda. de Sánchez Serrano
 Mirada de mujer: El regreso  (2003) - Doña Elena viuda de Domínguez "Mamálena"
 La heredera (2004)
 Amores cruzados (2006) - Sara
 Pasión Morena (2009–2010) - Doña Josefina Vda. de Sirenio

Television series
 La hora marcada'' (Episodio: Pin pon papas) (1989)

References

External links
 Elizondo's paintings

1929 births
2017 deaths
20th-century Mexican actresses
Mexican television actresses
Actresses from Mexico City
Mexican stage actresses
Mexican film actresses
Mexican telenovela actresses
20th-century Mexican women writers
20th-century Mexican writers
Mexican women artists
Mexican women singers
21st-century Mexican actresses
Singers from Mexico City